Jack Downing may refer to:

Jack Downing (footballer) (fl. 1930s), Darlington F.C. footballer
Jack Downing (sculptor) (1920–1993), British sculptor
Jack G. Downing (1940–2021), Deputy Director for Operations for the CIA from 1997 until July 1999
Major Jack Downing, American writer Seba Smith's popular series character

See also
John Downing (disambiguation)